An adz is a woodworking tool.

Adz or ADZ may also refer to:

 Adamanzane, a nitrogen compound
 Adzera language
 Allgemeine Deutsche Zeitung für Rumänien, a German-language Romanian newspaper
 Amiga Disk File
 Gustavo Rojas Pinilla International Airport, San Andrés, Colombia
 The Age of Adz, an album by Sufjan Stevens